Junus Effendi Habibie (11 June 1937 – 12 March 2012) also known as Fanny Habibie was an Indonesian diplomat and younger brother of the third Indonesian President, B. J. Habibie.

Habibie was born in Parepare as the fifth of eight children. In 1961 he graduated from the Naval Academy in Surabaya. During the New Order he served as director general for marine transportation affairs.

In 1993 he was named Indonesian ambassador the United Kingdom, a position which he held until 1998. In 2006 he was named Indonesian ambassador to the Netherlands. In September 2010 he had an interview with Dutch newspaper Het Financieele Dagblad in which he made several remarks about the Party for Freedom and the people who voted for it, amongst others saying that those voters might be suffering from a "fear psychosis". His remarks led to questions in the Dutch parliament by Party for Freedom MPs Geert Wilders and Wim Kortenoeven. In the questions they asked whether Dutch Foreign Ministers Maxime Verhagen was willing to call Habibie over to the Foreign Ministry, Verhagen however did not wish to do so, citing that the remarks were made in freedom of speech and that Habibie had already retracted his words. Another incident occurred when Indonesian President Susilo Bambang Yudhoyono cancelled his planned visit to the Netherlands for October 2010. Indonesia decided to cancel after it received information that the President might be arrested due to a court complaint made by the government-in-exile of the Republic of South Maluku of human rights violations. Habibie's term as ambassador ended late 2001.

He had had bypass surgery two times before.

References

1937 births
2012 deaths
People from Parepare
Ambassadors of Indonesia to the United Kingdom
Ambassadors of Indonesia to the Netherlands
Junus